The following lists events that happened in 1984 in Iceland.

Incumbents
President – Vigdís Finnbogadóttir 
Prime Minister – Steingrímur Hermannsson

Events

11 March—The boat Hellisey VE-503 sank

4 September-Volcano Krafla erupted

Births

7 February – Smári McCarthy, innovator and information activist
17 February – Ásgeir Örn Hallgrímsson, handball player
18 February – Sölvi Ottesen, footballer
27 April – Hannes Þór Halldórsson, footballer.
25 May – Unnur Birna Vilhjálmsdóttir, model and beauty contestant, Miss World 2005.
20 September – Hólmfríður Magnúsdóttir, footballer
28 October – Kári Kristjánsson, handball player.
29 October – Ásta Birna Gunnarsdóttir, handball player

Deaths
11 July – Ragnar Jonsson, art patron, book publisher and art collector (b. 1904) 
18 July – Ingólfur Jónsson, politician (b. 1909).
16 September – Hallgrímur Fr. Hallgrímsson, businessman (b. 1905)

References

 
1980s in Iceland
Iceland
Iceland
Years of the 20th century in Iceland